John Cyrus Heimsch (September 18, 1902 – May 27, 1991) was a halfback in the National Football League. He played with the Milwaukee Badgers during the 1926 NFL season.

References

1902 births
1991 deaths
People from Isabella County, Michigan
Players of American football from Michigan
Milwaukee Badgers players
American football halfbacks
Marquette Golden Avalanche football players